Eupithecia rectilinea is a moth in the family Geometridae. It is found in Costa Rica.

References

Moths described in 1913
rectilinea
Moths of Central America